What Do I Do with Me is the nineteenth studio album by American country music singer Tanya Tucker, released on July 2, 1991. It was her highest-placing on the Billboard charts reaching #6 in the Country albums and #48 on the Pop albums categories. The album produced four Top Five hits on the Hot Country Songs charts: "(Without You) What Do I Do with Me" and "Down to My Last Teardrop" both at number two, "Some Kind of Trouble" at number three, and "If Your Heart Ain't Busy Tonight" at number four. The track "Everything That You Want" was later covered by Reba McEntire for her 1994 album, Read My Mind.

Track listing

Personnel
As listed in liner notes.
Tanya Tucker - vocals
Eddie Bayers - drums
Mark Casstevens - acoustic guitar
Beth Nielsen Chapman - backing vocals
Paul Davis - backing vocals
Sonny Garrish - steel guitar
Steve Gibson - acoustic guitar, electric guitar
Greg Gordon - backing vocals
Rob Hajacos - fiddle
Jim Horn - saxophone
Mitch Humphries - keyboards
David Innis - synthesizer
Mike Lawler - synthesizer
Paul Leim - drums
Liana Manis - backing vocals
Donna McElroy - backing vocals
Terry McMillan - harmonica
Wayland Patton - backing vocals
Brent Rowan - electric guitar
Bob Wray - bass guitar
Curtis Young - backing vocals

Charts

Weekly charts

Year-end charts

References

 Tanya Tucker on CMA awards database
 The Billboard Book of Top 40 Country Hits by Joel Whitburn [2006] 

1991 albums
Tanya Tucker albums
Capitol Records albums
Albums produced by Jerry Crutchfield